Tinkar is a village in the Byans Rural Municipality of Darchula District in the Sudurpashchim province of Nepal. It is named after the Tinkar Khola river, a tributary of the Mahakali River, which it joins near the village of Chhangru.

At the top of the Tinkar valley near the Tibet border is the Tinkar Pass (5,258 m), which provides a trading route for the Byansis of the region for the Tibetan trading centre Burang. However, the Tinkaris are said to prefer the Lipulekh Pass across the border in Indian territory due to its higher volume. Nepal has ongoing claims to the Lipulekh Pass, as part of the Kalapani territory.

Geography 

Tinkar is in the far-western region of Nepal, in the province of Sudurpashchim Province at the high end of the Great Himalayan range, elevation . It is the principal village in the valley of the Tinkar River (Tinkar Khola), which is a tributary of the Mahakali River (or Kali River and Sarda River). Mahakali serves as the western boundary of Nepal with India, beyond which lies the Indian region of Kumaon (part of the Uttarakhand state).

Along the Tinkar Valley, closer to the border, is another large village called Chhangru (or Changru). Tinkar (80 households) and Chhangru (100 households) are populated by Byansi people, who speak a West Himalayish language called Byangsi. The region across the border in Kumaon is also populated by Byansi people, with whom the Byansis of the Tinkar Valley have cultural and historical links. A third village called Ghaga, at the confluence of Tinkar and Nampa rivers, is populated by other classes of people.

Upstream along one of the headwaters of the Tinkar Khola is the Tinkar Pass (or "Tinkar Lipu") at the top of the Great Himalayan range, which provides a historical trading route for the Byansis to the Tibetan town of Burang. This pass is however insignificant for the overall economy of Nepal because the far-western region is cut off from the rest of the country by "high impassable mountains and glaciers". Manzard et al. state that the Tinkar Byansis also used to use the Lipulekh Pass because the Tinkar Pass is quite difficult to traverse.

While the general border runs along the Mahakali River, in the upper headwaters above the Kalapani village, it is the watershed of the streams that flow into the river. This was a decision made by the British Indian government in the 19th century.
Two significant peaks, P. 6172 and Om Parvat (5590 m), lie on this watershed range, which are popular trekking destinations. Nepal has ongoing claims to the territory beyond the watershed, up to the main headwater stream, which is termed the Kalapani territory.

History 
According to the Himalayan Gazetteer, the entire Byans region to the south as well as north of the Mahakali River used to be part of Kumaon. After the unification of Nepal in the 18th century, Nepal expanded northwest and conquered the kingdoms of Kumaon as well as Garhwal. The expansion lasted till 1815. In that year, the Anglo-Nepalese War saw the British general Ochterlony evict the Nepalese from Garhwal and Kumaon across the Mahakali River. After agreeing the Treaty of Sugauli, which made a territorial settlement along the Mahakali River, the Nepalese appealed to the British governor general that they were entitled to the areas to the east (here, southeast) of the Mahakali River. The British conceded the demand, and the Tinkar Valley with its large villages of Chhangru and Tinkar was transferred to Nepal. The British, however, retained the areas to the northwest of the Mahakali River, including the Kuthi Valley and the Kalapani territory near the headwaters of the Mahakali. Thus the "parganah [of] Byans" got divided across the two countries.

Since the British operated an open border with Nepal, allowing free movement of people across it, the normal intercourse of the Tinkaris with their fellow Byansis on the Indian side is likely to have continued unhindered. They continued to use the Lipulekh Pass on the Indian side for their commerce with the Tibetans. They also use the road on the Indian side to travel to Khalanga where they spend the winters as part of their transhumance practices. The footbridge at Sitapul near the mouth of Tinkar Khola is used to transit to the Indian side of the border. Likewise the zamindars (landholders) on the Indian side that owned land in Nepal continued to operate such lands.

The Tinkar Pass at the top of the Tinkar Valley is the de facto tri-junction between China, India and Nepal. Article 1 of the China–Nepal border treaty of 1961 states:

This being the precise geographical description of the location of the Tinkar Pass, the Border Pillar numbered 1 of the China–Nepal border was placed here.

Following the Chinese take-over of Tibet, India and Nepal jointly operated a number of checkposts along the Tibet border starting in 1952. According to Nepalese geographer Buddhi Narayan Shrestha, one of these was at the Tinkar Pass. In 1969, Nepal asked for the Indian personnel to be withdrawn from the  posts, and India did so, with the understanding that Nepal would continue to man the posts.  Former Indian Army general Ashok K. Mehta states that none of the posts remained afterwards. Subsequently, India stepped up security and surveillance on the Indian side of the Nepal–India border and also introduced a permit system for the use of Indian roads.

According to The Rising Nepal, a checkpost was established at the Tinkar village around 1972, by an Assistant Sub-Inspector, who was also in charge of patrolling up to Chhangru. The officer claimed to have patrolled up to the Kalapani village with arms once, along the Indian road, while the Indian security kept him under surveillance. He was denied a permit to visit it a second time.

After the 1962 border war between India and China, India closed the Lipulekh Pass at the top of the Kalapani river valley. The Byansis of Kumaon then used the Tinkar Pass for all their trade with Tibet. In 1997, India and China agreed to reopen the Lipulekh pass, and the use of the Tinkar Pass had declined.

Status 
According to the Chairperson of the Byas Rural Municipality, Chhangru is the last Nepali village along the Mahakali river heading north. He states that the roads on the Nepali side are bad and the villagers have to use the Indian roads to get to Chhangru. They have to obtain permits from the Indian administration for this purpose. He complained of the attitude of the Indian administrators, which he described as "condescending".

There is a walk bridge over the Mahakali River near Chhangru called Sita Pul, which allows passage between India and Nepal. Nepal used to have a customs point at this location, which was abandoned during the conflict period, and has not yet been reinstated. During the conflict period, the area was controlled by the Maoist rebels, who charged "tax" (protection money) on wildlife trafficking through the Tinkar route. Illegal  animal products from India are said to have been trafficked, including tiger skins, tiger bones and parts, musk deer pouches and yarsagumba. The Nepali Times journalists estimated that the rebels earned Rs. 35 million annually through such "taxes". Such trafficking is still ongoing as of 2019.

News reports in May 2018 state that the trade with Tibet is "almost nil", and it has been so for the last five or six years. "There is neither road access from the Nepal side to bring goods imported from Tibet nor is there [a] customs office," according to The Kathmandu Post.

Between 2013 and 2020, India laid a (motorable) link road on the Indian side of the river. When it was inaugurated in May 2020, the Nepalese government protested, calling it a "unilateral act".

Bir Bahadur Chand, the police officer that established the Tinkar checkpost, states that the controversies surrounding the Kalapani territory are raised only by the Kathmandu media, and they cause a lot of difficulties for the people of the Tinkar region.

See also
 Kalapani territory
 Kuthi Valley

Notes

References

Bibliography
 
 
 
 
 
 
 
 
 
 
 

Sudurpashchim Province
Mountain passes of Nepal